Szabados is a Hungarian surname. Notable people with this surname include:

 Attila Szabados, Serbian-Hungarian football player
 Béla Szabados (composer), Hungarian composer
 Béla Szabados (swimmer), Hungarian swimmer
 Eugenio Szabados, Hungarian–Italian chess master
 György Szabados, Hungarian pianist
 László Szabados, Hungarian swimmer 
 Miklós Szabados, Hungarian table tennis player
 Shannon Szabados, Canadian ice hockey player

Hungarian-language surnames